You Brought Me Back is the twenty-second studio album by American country music singer-songwriter Tammy Wynette. It was released on June 22, 1981, by Epic Records.

Commercial performance 
The album failed to chart on the Billboard Country Albums chart. The album's first single, "Cowboys Don't Shoot Straight (Like They Used To)", peaked at No. 21 on the Billboard Country Singles chart, and the second single, "Crying in the Rain", peaked at No. 18.

Album Notes 
"Easy Come, Easy Go" is a Mama Cass Elliot cover from her 1969 album, Bubblegum, Lemonade, and... Something for Mama.  Wynette also recorded a completely different song also called "Easy Come, Easy Go" on her 1976 album, 'Til I Can Make It on My Own, which is a Dobie Gray cover from his 1975 album, New Ray of Sunshine.

Track listing

Personnel
Adapted from the album liner notes.
Chips Moman - producer
Tammy Wynette - lead vocals

Chart positions

Singles

References

1981 albums
Tammy Wynette albums
Epic Records albums
Albums produced by Billy Sherrill